Wamba panamensis is a species of comb-footed spider in the family Theridiidae. It is found in Panama and Ecuador.

References

Theridiidae
Spiders described in 1959
Spiders of Central America
Spiders of South America